European National Front (ENF) was a coordinating structure of European ultranationalist parties. There had been one elected MEP from ENF in the past. He was the leader of the Italian New Force, Roberto Fiore.

Three parties of the European National Front are today included at the Alliance for Peace and Freedom.

Structure
The European National Front is headed by General Secretary, elected by ENF Assembly. The current General Secretary is Roberto Fiore. The Political Council is the founder's staff of the ENF. It safeguards the idea and principles of ENF. The Council can be increased by unanimous will of cooptation. It represents the Front outside, and confirms applications for ENF membership. The Members of the Council belong to ENF Assembly. The ENF Assembly defines the tactics and strategy of ENF. The Assembly consists of representatives of the movements belonging to ENF and members of Political Council. The Co-ordination Centre executes the current tasks of ENF. It gathers information and propaganda, and co-ordinates ENF activities.

Legal registered political parties/movements that accept the principles, aims and structure of ENF can apply for membership. The accession to ENF must be submitted by authorized representative of the applicant and then confirmed by Political Council. The representative of the Affiliated Group sits on the Assembly with advisory vote. The status of the Affiliated Group can be granted by Political Council.

Member parties

Affiliated groups

Former affiliates

See also 
 Alliance for Peace and Freedom
 Alliance of European National Movements
 Euronat

External links
Developments and news-ENF (Romanian language)

Nationalist organizations
Pan-European political parties
Neo-fascist organizations
Far-right politics in Europe
Far-right political parties
Third Position
Anti-communist organizations